Religion in Louisville, Kentucky, includes religious institutions of various faiths; including Christianity, Judaism, Islam, Hinduism, Buddhism and Sikhism.

Christianity

Roman Catholic Church
The Cathedral of the Assumption in downtown Louisville is the seat of the Archdiocese of Louisville. Our Lady of Gethsemani Abbey, the monastic home of Catholic writer Thomas Merton, is in nearby Bardstown, Kentucky, and also in the archdiocese. Most of Louisville's Roman Catholic population is of German descent, the result of large-scale 19th-century immigration.

Bellarmine University and Spalding University in Louisville are affiliated with the Roman Catholic Church.

Protestant denominations
One in three Louisvillians is Southern Baptist, belonging to one of 147 local congregations. This denomination increased in number when large numbers of people moved into Louisville in the early 20th century from rural Kentucky and Tennessee to work in the city's factories; some of these migrants also formed Holiness and Pentecostal churches and Churches of Christ.

German immigrants in the 19th century brought not only a large Catholic population, but also the Lutheran and Evangelical faiths, which are represented today in Louisville by the Evangelical Lutheran Church in America, the Lutheran Church–Missouri Synod, and the United Church of Christ, respectively.

The city is home to two megachurches. Southeast Christian Church, with its main campus in Middletown and three others in the surrounding region, is, the seventh-largest church in the United States. St. Stephen Church is the 38th largest in the US, and has the largest African American congregation in Kentucky.

The city is home to several religious institutions: the Southern Baptist Theological Seminary, Louisville Bible College, Louisville Presbyterian Theological Seminary and the denominational headquarters of the Presbyterian Church (USA).

Louisville is home to the oldest African-American Seventh-day Adventist congregation, Magazine Street Church.

The historic Christ Church Cathedral is the seat of the Episcopal Diocese of Kentucky, which covers the western part of the state.

Eastern Orthodox 
Louisville has two Eastern Orthodox parishes: Assumption Greek Orthodox Church, and the Antiochian parish, St. Michael the Archangel (with a Chapel, St. George).

Other sects
The Louisville Kentucky Temple, the 76th temple of the Church of Jesus Christ of Latter-day Saints (Mormons), is located in nearby Pewee Valley (mailing address of Crestwood), and serves members of the church in Kentucky, Southern Indiana, parts of Ohio and West Virginia.

The city is also the home of three Unitarian Universalist churches: All Peoples Unitarian Universalist Congregation (formerly Thomas Jefferson Unitarian Church), First Unitarian Church, and Clifton Unitarian Church.

Judaism
The Jewish population of around 14,200 in the region is served by five synagogues. Most Jewish families emigrated from Eastern Europe at the start of the 20th century; around 800 Soviet Jews have moved to Louisville since 1991. Jewish immigrants founded Jewish Hospital in what was once the center of the city's Jewish district. From 2005 to 2012, Jewish Hospital merged with two Kentucky-based Catholic healthcare systems to form KentuckyOne Health, which later in 2012 announced a partnership with the University of Louisville Hospital. A significant focal point for Louisville's Jewish community is located near Bowman Field, where there are two Orthodox synagogues (including Anshei Sfard, founded in 1893), the Jewish Community Center, Jewish Family and Career Services, and an affordable housing complex. One of the most historically prominent members of Louisville's Jewish community was Justice Louis Brandeis, a Louisville native who became the first Jew to sit on the Supreme Court of the United States in 1916.

Islam
In 2001, there were an estimated 4,000 to 10,000 practicing Muslims in Louisville attending six local mosques. These mosques include the Westport Mosque, a part of the newly founded Muslim Community Center. The Muslim Community Center includes The Islamic School of Louisville (ISofL), an expanding school located on Old Westport Road. The ISofL is adjacent to the Westport Mosque.

Hinduism
The Hindu temple of Kentucky  opened in suburban Louisville in 1999, and had about 125 members and two full-time priests in 2000. The temple was renovated and rededicated in the summer of 2011.

Buddhism
Various Buddhist sanghas and organizations exist in and around the Louisville area. These include: The Louisville Community of Mindful Living (formerly "The Sangha of Louisville"), the Drepung Gomang Center for Engaging Compassion, and the Vietnamese Buddhist Association of Louisville.

Taoism
Taoist practices in Louisville are represented by a local branch  of the International Taoist Tai Chi Society.

Baháʼí Faith
The Baháʼí Faith has been present in Louisville from the 1920s, with the first Baháʼí center opening in 1965. The current Baháʼí center, dating to 1999, was designed to accommodate a larger active Baháʼí community.

Neopaganism
Louisville is home to a strong and vibrant Pagan community, including Wicca and other neopagan religions. There are over 60 Kentucky pagan groups listed at Witchvox, including over a dozen in Louisville. (Witchvox listings are voluntary, and usually represent only a small portion of the local pagan groups. Many or most covens and other pagan groups still prefer to remain private, as a way to avoid religious persecution.) Local networking for Louisville pagans is organized in various ways, not only through local covens and groves, but also through Louisville Pagan Pride, local pagan meetups via meetup.com, local occult shops such as MoonStruck, and a CUUPS chapter at a local Unitarian church. There was a Pagan Student Union active for years at the University of Louisville, but the club is currently dormant.

Interfaith activities
Since 1996, the Center for Interfaith Relations has hosted Festival of Faiths, a multi-day national interfaith gathering featuring music, poetry, film, art and dialogue with internationally renowned spiritual leaders, thinkers and practitioners. The Huffington Post ranked the Festival of Faiths sixth in its list of America’s top spiritual travel destinations.

See also
 Religion in Kentucky

References